The Rowing Competition at the 1991 Mediterranean Games was held in Athens, Greece, marking a return of the sport to the Mediterranean Games program after a 12-year absence.

Medalists

Medal table

References
1991 Mediterranean Games report at the International Committee of Mediterranean Games (CIJM) website

M
Sports at the 1991 Mediterranean Games
 
Rowing competitions in Greece